Love in Bloom may refer to:
"Love in Bloom" (song), a 1934 popular song by Ralph Rainger and Leo Robin
Love in Bloom (film), a 1935 comedy film with George Burns